Phulala Sugandha Maticha was an Indian Marathi language television series, which is broadcast on Star Pravah from 2 September 2020. The show is an official adaptation of the StarPlus series Diya Aur Baati Hum. Both shows are produced by Shashi and Sumeet Mittal under the banner Shashi Sumeet Productions.

Plot 
Set on backdrop of Shirdi. The story centers upon a 20-year-old college student, Kirti, whose dream is to become an Indian Police Service officer and Shubham, a sweetshop owner and sweetmaker. Kirti's dreams and aspirations are destroyed as she loses her parents in a terrorist attack. Planning to move abroad, her brother Sagar fixes her marriage to Shubham whose strict mother Jiji Akka wants her daughter-in-law to be simple and not well-educated, with the excellent skills of a housewife.

After discovering this, Sagar lies about Kirti's education level to both his family and the Jamkhedkars in order to ensure her settlement. Kirti gives up her education and dreams, accepting her roles as a wife and the elder daughter-in-law of the family. Soon, as her truth of being educated and not knowing cooking is revealed, Jiji Akka banishes her. The story shows and further describes how Shubham becomes her full-strength and helps her to fulfil her dreams.

Cast

Main 
 Harshad Atkari as Lavdya Shubham Daulatrao Jamkhedkar
 Samruddhi Kelkar as Kirti Mangesh Kadam / Kirti Shubham Jamkhedkar

Recurring 
Shubham's family
 Aditi Deshpande as Chandrakala Daulatrao Jamkhedkar (Jiji akka)
 Prashant Choudappa as Daulatrao Jamkhedkar (Bhau)
 Aishwarya Shete / Kanchan Prakash as Sonali Vikram Jamkhedkar
 Tushar Sali / Mayur More as Lavdya Vikram Daulatrao Jamkhedkar
 Bhumija Patil as Janhavi Daulatrao Jamkhedkar
 Akash Patil as Lavdya Tushar Daulatrao Jamkhedkar
 Madhura Joshi as Emily Tushar Jamkhedkar
 Nikita Patil as Bhingari
 Dutta Sagar as Lahanya

Kirti's family
 Sandeep Mehta as Mangesh Kadam
 Radhika Vidyasagar as Mrs. Kadam
 Amogh Chandan as Lavdya Sagar Mangesh Kadam
 Purva Phadake as Aarti Sagar Kadam

Others 
 Usha Naik as Kakisaheb
 Girish Oak as Swami Avatar Swarup Maharaj
 Tejashri Pradhan as guest
 Kalyani Tapase as Madhuri
 Ajinkya Pitale as Sandy
 Shekhar Phadake as Kiran
 Sai Ranade as Lily
 Bhagyashri Navale as Kavita
 Shreyas Raje as Lavdya Rajkumar (Raju)
 Manasi Kulkarni

Reception

Mahaepisode (1 hour) 
 11 October 2020
 15 November 2020
 20 December 2020
 7 February 2021
 14 March 2021
 21 March 2021
 4 April 2021
 9 May 2021
 22 August 2021
 12 September 2021
 31 October 2021
 19 December 2021
 6 February 2022
 27 February 2022
 19 June 2022
 7 August 2022
 18 September 2022
 9 October 2022
 4 December 2022

Ratings

Awards

References

External links 
 
 Phulala Sugandha Maticha at Disney+ Hotstar

Marathi-language television shows
2020 Indian television series debuts
Star Pravah original programming
2022 Indian television series endings